Simon Phipps may refer to:
 Simon Phipps (bishop) (1921–2001), Bishop of Lincoln (1974–1987)
 Simon Phipps (game designer) (born 1966), British game designer
 Simon Phipps (programmer), open source advocate
 Simon Phipps, conductor of the Swedish Chamber Choir
 Simon Phipps, lead singer of the band The Engineers